Joseph Seamon Cotter Jr. (September 2, 1895 – February 3, 1919) was an American playwright, writer and poet from Louisville, Kentucky most remembered for his posthumously published one-act play On The Fields of France in addition to numerous volumes of poetry.

Early life

Cotter Jr. was born and lived the formative years of his life in Louisville, Kentucky, where he attended Central High School until his graduation in 1911. His father, Joseph Seamon Cotter Sr., a noted African-American playwright in his own regard, was the principal when Cotter Jr. graduated.

Education
Cotter subsequently attended Fisk University in Nashville, TN, before contracting tuberculosis, a disease that would claim the life of his sister, Florence Olivia, in 1914.

Career
After falling ill, Cotter Jr. returned to Louisville and began work as a journalist for the Leader. Cotter Jr. avoided mimicking the style of his father and instead "experimented with free and, in Rain Music, rhythmic styles. His father was instrumental in promoting his son's work after his death in 1920 from tuberculosis. He was said by many to have had the potential to be the greatest poet of his generation.

References

External links
 

Writers from Louisville, Kentucky
American writers
Harlem Renaissance
1895 births
1919 deaths
20th-century American male writers
20th-century African-American writers
African-American male writers